Passive-Aggressive Notes is a website that documents "painfully polite and hilariously hostile notes from shared spaces the world over"; most of these spaces are shared apartments, offices, or stores.

Passive-Aggressive Notes is similar to other projects like Found Magazine and PostSecret that also collect handwritten notes, and shares a similar "blog" format (where readers send in their own entries to the site) as the humor sites Photoshop Disasters, Not Always Right, Overheard in the ER,  and Things My Mother Said.

Purpose
According to the site, "for the purposes of this project, we're using a pretty broad definition of "passive-aggressive" that roughly correlates with how the term is popularly used."

As the New York Times wrote: "the classic description of the behavior captures a stubborn malcontent, someone who passively resists fulfilling routine tasks, complains of being misunderstood and underappreciated, unreasonably scorns authority and voices exaggerated complaints of personal misfortune"."

History
The site was founded in May 2007, by Kerry Miller, a writer based in Brooklyn, New York.

Passive-Aggressive Notes has spawned a book published by HarperCollins. In the United States and Canada, it is titled Passive-Aggressive Notes; while, in the United Kingdom and Australia, it is titled Your Mother Doesn't Work Here.

See also
Passive-aggressive behavior
Passive Aggressive: Singles 2002–2010

References

External links 
 

American comedy websites
Internet properties established in 2007
2007 establishments in the United States